The Model Technical Higher Secondary School (MTHSS) is the pioneer in a group of Model Technical Higher Secondary Schools located in Kerala, India. These schools were established to provide education in the technological and hi-tech sectors.

The schools are managed by the IHRD (Institute of Human Resources Development) and promote scientific advancement, technological progress and economic growth. The instruction is conducted in English.

The institution
The Model Technical Higher Secondary School, Kaloor was established in 1990 as the first of its kind in Kerala under the aegis of the Institute of Human Resources development, Thiruvananthapuram. A pioneer in providing technical education especially in Electronics, Computer Science and related areas, IHRD today runs more than forty institutions.

The school is coeducational preparing students of Secondary (VIII to X) and Higher Secondary (XI and XII) levels. The school of Kochi was started in 1990. The Model Technical Higher Secondary School is located at Kaloor. The Model Technical Higher Secondary School in Kochi is one of the higher secondary schools of Kochi, that is, it imparts both secondary and higher secondary education. The secondary section of the school includes class 8 to class 10. The higher secondary section of the school includes classes 11 and 12.

The school comes within the scope of the Institute of Human Resources Development or the IHRD. Therefore, the Technical Higher Secondary School is managed and controlled by the director of the Institute of Human Resources Development. This institute of Kerala is located at Thiruvananthapuram.

Course of studies

Technical High School Leaving Certificate
Electronics Production Techniques, Electronics Trade Theory, Electrical Technology and Computer Science are the additional subjects along with the syllabus followed by the board of Public Examinations. Students who secure minimum marks prescribed for each subject in the terminal examination of VIII and IX Standards are promoted to the next higher class. Those who fail in tho consecutive chances in a standard are not eligible to continue their study in the school. The successful completion of Std. X will lead to the awarding of THSLC (Technical High School Leaving Certificate) of the Board of Public Examinations, Kerala.

Technical Higher Secondary Course
There are two groups in the Technical Higher Secondary Course (THSC) viz., Physical Science and Integrated Science in the Physical Science group, the technical subjects are Computer Information Technology and Electronics Service Technology. Life Science is not included in the Physical Science group. The Integrated Science group includes Life Science instead of one of the technical subjects viz., Electronics Service Technology. NCERT Syllabus is followed in the Technical Higher Secondary Course. For standard XI, internal examination is conducted and the successful completion of standard XII leads to the award of HSLC. (Higher Secondary Leaving Certificate) by the Board of Higher Secondary Education of the Government of Kerala.

Other courses
Post Graduate Diploma in Computer Applications
Practical Course in Office Automation
Practice oriented training programme in Computer Techniques and Applications
Practice oriented short term course in Electronics and Computer Science for High School Students.

See also
List of schools in Ernakulam

References

 Model Technical Higher Secondary School - (Diary 2007-2008)
 Website

External links
 Institute of Human Resources Development
 Directorate of Higher Secondary Education, Government of Kerala
 Library kits for government schools in Kochi, https://www.thehindu.com/news/cities/Kochi/library-kits-for-government-schools-in-kochi/article30906365.ece

High schools and secondary schools in Kochi
Educational institutions established in 1990
1990 establishments in Kerala